Below is the list of parks in Columbus, Georgia, United States (this list includes parks, as well as recreation centers, senior centers, and state parks):

Parks

Anderson Village Park
Beallwood Park
Belvedeer Park
Benning Hills Park
Bibb Soccer Field Park
Boxwood Park
Britt David Park
Carver Park
Chattahoochee Promenade Park
Cooper Creek Park
Crystal Valley Park
Dinglewood Park
Double Churches Park
Edgewood Park
Ewart Park
Flat Rock Park
Heath Park
Hemlock Park
Heritage Park
Lakebottom Park
Little Wildwood Park

Michael Fluellen Park
Ninth Street Park
North Columbus Park
Old Dominion Park
Plez Johnson Park
Pop Austin Park
Primus King Park
Psalmond Road Park
Rigdon Park
Roadside Park
Rosehill Heights Park
Rotary Park
Sherwood Park
Shirley Winston Park
South Lawyers Lane Park
South Lumpkin Park
Theo McGee Park
Williamsburg Park
Woodruff Farm Road Park
Woodruff Park

Recreation centers
29th Street Recreation Center
Ardahlia Mack Recreation Center
Frank D. Chester Recreation Center
Northside Park Recreation Center

Senior parks/centers
Edgewood Senior Park
Fox Senior Center
Gallops Senior Park
South Columbus Senior Center

State parks
Standing Boy Creek State Park

References

External links
Parks at columbusga.org
List of parks in Columbus with their information

Geography of Columbus, Georgia
Tourist attractions in Columbus, Georgia
Parks in Georgia (U.S. state)
Protected areas of Muscogee County, Georgia
Columbus